Bryan Reynolds may refer to:

 Bryan Reynolds (scholar) (born 1965), American critical theorist, performance theorist, Shakespeare scholar, playwright, director
 Bryan Reynolds (baseball) (born 1995), American baseball outfielder
 Bryan Reynolds (soccer) (born 2001), American soccer player

See also
 Brian Reynolds (disambiguation)